Thue Ersted Rasmussen (born November 15, 1985) is a Danish actor.

Filmography

Film

TV series

References

External links
 

1985 births
Living people
Danish male film actors
Danish male television actors
People from Aalborg